Biyagama Divisional Secretariat is a  Divisional Secretariat  of Gampaha District, of Western Province, Sri Lanka.

References
 Divisional Secretariats Portal

Divisional Secretariats of Gampaha District